The Ljubljana International Film Festival (also known as LIFFe) is an international film festival established in 1990 and held annually in Ljubljana, Slovenia.

Apart from screenings of Slovenian films, it also regularly features renowned authors' film retrospectives, international independent film programmes and a short films competition.

Awards
Awards presented at the most recent 2007 edition were as follows:
 The Kingfisher Award for best debut or second film by up-and-coming directors
 The Golden Reel Award (Audience Award) for best film overall, as voted by audiences
 The FIPRESCI Award, given by an international film critics' jury
 The Amnesty International Slovenia Award for best film that deals with a theme related to human rights issues

Award winners

2007 LIFFe

2008 LIFFe

2012 LIFFe

References

External links
LIFFe official website
LIFFe at IMDb

Film festivals in Slovenia
Film festivals established in 1990
Cultural events in Ljubljana
1990 establishments in Slovenia